Katell Quillévéré (born 30 January 1980) is a French film director and screenwriter, known for directing the films Love Like Poison (2010) and Suzanne (2013). In 2015 she was selected to be a member of the jury for the International Critics' Week section of the 2015 Cannes Film Festival.

She is the daughter of an IT worker and science teacher and until the age of 5 was brought up in the Ivory Coast. She comes from a Breton family from Finistère.

Her family returned to Paris and after studying at the Lycée Fénelon, chose a career in cinema. Failing to get a place at la Fémis the French national film school  she took a Diplôme d'études approfondies (DEA) at the l'université Paris-VIII where she also studied philosophy. During this time she met her partner another director-to-be Hélier Cisterne.

With Sébastien Bailly she set up the Festival du cinéma at Brive dedicated to medium length films. She made a series of short films, the first was À bras le corps in 2005 which was selected for the Quinzaine des réalisateurs at Cannes and nominated for a César. She then made L'Imprudence in 2007 and L’Échappée in 2009.

Her first feature Un Poison violent (Love like Poison) was set in Brittany and was the story of a young adolescent girl torn between family loyalties, her religious beliefs and the changes from girl to woman. It won the Jean Vigo prize. Her second feature Suzanne was about a young woman living a normal life whose world is disturbed by a romance with a troubled man that takes her into a life on the wrong side of the tracks. It was shown at the 2013 Cannes Film Festival and received good reviews with Le Monde's critic describing her as treading in the steps of Maurice Pialat. In 2016 she released Réparer le vivants , Heal the Living which again received a César nomination.

Filmography

Awards and honors 
 Chevalier of the Order of Arts and Letters (2015)

References

External links

Living people
1980 births
French film directors
French women film directors
French women screenwriters
French screenwriters
People from Abidjan
People from Finistère
French people of Breton descent
French expatriates in Ivory Coast
Chevaliers of the Ordre des Arts et des Lettres